Sofiane Mimouni (born 1957, Algiers) has been the Permanent Representative of Algeria to the United Nations since October 2019.  Director General for Africa at the Ministry of Foreign Affairs, from 2015 to 2019. He has also served as Algeria’s Ambassador to Iran from 2009 to 2014, Director‑General of the Asia-Oceania Department at the Ministry of Foreign Affairs from 2005 to 2009 and Ambassador to Indonesia, Australia, New Zealand, Singapore, Brunei Darussalam and Vanuatu from 1996 to 2004.

He led several Algerian delegations to various international Conferences and meetings.

He has been elected Chairman of the Committee on Conferences of the General Assembly of the United Nations for the year 2020.

He has been also appointed in 2020 by the President of the General Assembly as co-facilitator of the intergovernmental process review of the functioning of the resident coordinator system and reconducted by the President of the General Assembly in 2021.

Mimouni earned a master’s degree in law from the University of Algiers, a bachelor’s degree from the High Institute of International Studies from the University of Paris and a postgraduate degree in international law from the University of Sorbonne in Paris.

References

Permanent Representatives of Algeria to the United Nations
Ambassadors of Algeria to Indonesia
Ambassadors of Algeria to Australia
Ambassadors of Algeria to New Zealand
Ambassadors of Algeria to Brunei
Living people
1957 births
Date of birth missing (living people)
University of Algiers alumni
University of Paris alumni
Ambassadors of Algeria to Iran
Ambassadors of Algeria to Singapore
Ambassadors of Algeria to Vanuatu
21st-century Algerian people